Florman is a surname. Notable people with the surname include:

Ernest Florman (1863–1952), Swedish director and photographer
Irving Florman (1892–1981), Polish-born American diplomat
Marianne Florman (born 1964), Danish team handball player
Mark Florman (born 1958), British businessman
Samuel C. Florman (born 1925), American civil engineer, contractor, and author
Sander S. Florman, American transplant surgeon